The Global Citizen Prize is an awards show organized by Global Citizen (formerly known as the Global Poverty Project), aimed at celebrating activists and leaders around the world. It began in September 2016 with the George Harrison Global Citizen Award (later renamed the Global Artist of the Year Award), and expanded to include more awards in 2018, 2019, and 2020.

History

2016 
The inaugural George Harrison Global Citizen Award was posthumously awarded to George Harrison during the “World on Stage” event at the 2016 Global Citizen Festival in New York.

2017 
In 2017, the George Harrison Award was given to Annie Lennox for her dedication to humanitarian work at the 2017 Global Citizen Festival in New York.

2018 
At the 2018 Global Citizen Festival: Mandela 100 event in Johannesburg, South Africa, the Global Poverty Project presented their first ever Global Citizen Prize for a World Leader, to Norwegian Prime Minister Erna Solberg, and the Cisco Youth Leadership Award, given to Wawira Njiru.

2019 
The 2019 Global Citizen Prize Awards was the first year awards were presented at a ceremony, hosted by John Legend at the Royal Albert Hall in London on December 13, 2019. The following prizes were presented during the ceremony, which was broadcast by NBC on December 20:

Global Citizen of the Year - Richard Curtis

Global Artist of the Year - Sting

Global Citizen Prize for World Leader - Amina J. Mohammed, Deputy Secretary General of the United Nations

Global Citizen Prize for Business Leader - Hamdi Ulukaya, Chobani Founder/CEO

Cisco Youth Leadership Award - Priya Prakash

2020 
The Global Citizen Prize Awards were broadcast (on NBC in the United States, and the CBC in Canada) and streamed live on December 19, 2020, and were hosted again by John Legend. The 2020 awards introduced multiple new awards for philanthropy, culture and education, activism, and the Country Hero Award.

Global Citizen of the Year - Bryan Stevenson

Global Citizen Artist of the Year - Elton John

Global Citizen Prize for World Leader - Ursula von der Leyen

Global Citizen Prize for Business Leader - Temie Giwa-Tubosun, Founder and CEO at LifeBank (Nigeria)

Global Citizen Prize for Activism - Black Lives Matter movement

Global Citizen Prize for Culture & Education - Sesame Workshop

Global Citizen Prize for Philanthropy - Warren Buffett

2022 
The 2022 Global Citizen Prize Awards were presented at the G20 Summit in Bali Indonesia on November 14, 2022.

Global Citizen Prize for World Leader - Joko Widodo, President of Indonesia

References

External links 

 Global Citizen Prize

Humanitarian and service awards